San Miguel, Spanish for Saint Michael, may refer to:

Places

Argentina
San Miguel Partido
San Miguel, Buenos Aires
 San Miguel, Catamarca
San Miguel, Corrientes
San Miguel, La Rioja
San Miguel Arcángel, a Volga German colony in Adolfo Alsina Partido, Buenos Aires Province
San Miguel del Monte
San Miguel Department, Corrientes
San Miguel de Tucumán

Belize
San Miguel, Belize, a village in Toledo District, Belize

Bolivia
San Miguel de Velasco
San Miguel del Bala, a little community in the rainforest on the Beni River, near Rurrenabaque

Brazil
São Miguel das Missões, a municipality in Rio Grande do Sul state, southern Brazil

Chile
San Miguel, Chile, in Santiago

Colombia
San Miguel, Putumayo, a town and municipality in the Putumayo Department
San Miguel, Santander, a town and municipality in the Santander Department
San Miguel de Sema a town and municipality in the Boyacá Department

Costa Rica
San Miguel District, Naranjo

Cuba
San Miguel del Padrón, a town and municipality in Havana

Ecuador
 San Miguel, Bolívar
San Miguel de Ibarra
San Miguel de Salcedo
San Miguel de los Bancos

El Salvador
San Miguel (volcano)
San Miguel Department (El Salvador)
San Miguel, El Salvador, capital of the forementioned department

Guatemala
San Miguel Acatán
San Miguel Chicaj
San Miguel Dueñas
San Miguel Ixtahuacán
San Miguel Panán
San Miguel Sigüilá

Mexico
San Miguel, Quintana Roo, the biggest city on the island Cozumel
San Miguel de Allende, Guanajuato
San Miguel de Horcasitas, in the state of Sonora
San Miguel el Alto, in the state of Jalisco
San Miguel Totocuitlapilco, in the State of México
San Miguel Totolapan, in the state of Guerrero
Misión San Miguel Arcángel de la Frontera, a Spanish Dominican mission in Ensenada, Baja California

Oaxaca, Mexico
San Miguel Achiutla	
San Miguel Ahuehuetitlán	
San Miguel Aloápam
San Miguel Amatitlán
San Miguel Amatlán
San Miguel Chicahua
San Miguel Chimalapa
San Miguel Coatlán
San Miguel del Puerto
San Miguel del Río
San Miguel Ejutla
San Miguel El Grande
San Miguel Huautla
San Miguel Mixtepec
San Miguel Panixtlahuaca
San Miguel Peras
San Miguel Piedras	
San Miguel Quetzaltepec
San Miguel Santa Flor	
San Miguel Soyaltepec
San Miguel Suchixtepec	
San Miguel Tecomatlán
San Miguel Tenango
San Miguel Tequixtepec
San Miguel Tilquiapam	
San Miguel Tlacamama
San Miguel Tlacotepec
San Miguel Tulancingo
San Miguel Yotao

Panama
San Miguel, Los Santos
San Miguel, Panamá Province

Paraguay
San Miguel, Paraguay, a district of the Misiones Department

Peru
San Miguel, La Mar Province, capital of the La Mar province
San Miguel District, Lima, a district in western Lima
San Miguel Province, a province in the Cajamarca region
San Miguel de Piura, the capital of the Piura province

Philippines
San Miguel, former name of Cebu
San Miguel Bay
 San Miguel Island (Philippines)
San Miguel, Bohol
San Miguel, Bulacan
San Miguel, Catanduanes
San Miguel, Iloilo
San Miguel, Manila
San Miguel, Leyte
San Miguel, Samar Gandara
San Miguel, Surigao del Sur
San Miguel, Zamboanga del Sur
San Miguel, Tarlac

Portugal
São Miguel Island, the largest and most populous island in the Portuguese archipelago of the Azores

Spain
 San Miguel de Abona, in the province of Santa Cruz de Tenerife
 San Miguel de Aguayo, Cantabria, in the autonomous community of Cantabria
 San Miguel de Aras, in the autonomous community of Cantabria;
 San Miguel de Basauri, in the province of Biscay
 San Miguel de Bernuy, in the province of Segovia
 San Miguel de Corneja, in the province of Ávila
 San Miguel de la Ribera, in the province of Zamora
 San Miguel de Salinas, in the province of Alicante
 San Miguel de Serrezuela, in the province of Ávila
 San Miguel de Valero, in the province of Salamanca
 San Miguel del Arroyo, in the province of Valladolid
 San Miguel del Cinca, in the province of Huesca
 San Miguel del Pino, in the province of Valladolid
 San Miguel del Robledo, in the province of Salamanca
 San Miguel del Valle, in the province of Zamora

United States
San Miguel, Arizona, census designated place
San Miguel, original name given to San Diego, California in 1542
San Miguel, Contra Costa County, California, census designated place
San Miguel, San Luis Obispo County, California, census designated place
Mission San Miguel Arcángel, located in the above
San Miguel de los Noches, California, former settlement in Kern County
San Miguel Island, the westernmost of California's Channel Islands
San Miguel, New Mexico
San Miguel County, Colorado 
San Miguel County, New Mexico
San Miguel River (Colorado)

Churches
San Miguel, Córdoba, Andalusia, Spain
Church of San Miguel (Cogolludo), Castile-La Mancha, Spain
Church of San Miguel (Jerez de la Frontera), Andalusia, Spain
San Miguel Church, Mota del Cuervo, Cuenca, Spain
Church of San Miguel (Vitoria), Basque Country, Spain
Church of the Monastery of San Miguel de Bárcena, Asturias, Spain
San Miguel Mission, Santa Fe, New Mexico
San Miguel de Socorro, Socorro, New Mexico
San Miguel Arcángel Church (Cabo Rojo), Puerto Rico
San Miguel Arcangel Church (Marilao), Bulacan, Philippines
San Miguel Arcangel Church (Masantol), Pampanga, Philippines
San Miguel Arcangel Church (San Miguel, Bulacan), Philippines

Ships
SS San Miguel, a ship
San Miguel, a 28-gun Spanish ship captured by the Royal Navy and renamed Coventry
 Spanish galleon San Miguel, a treasure ship

Forts
 Fort San Miguel, Vancouver Island, Canada
 Fuerte de San Miguel (Campeche), Mexico; see timeline of Campeche City
 Fuerte San Miguel (Uruguay)

Other uses
Barangay Ginebra San Miguel, a professional basketball team in the Philippines
Ginebra San Miguel, a Filipino beverage company and namesake gin brand
"San Miguel" (song), recorded by The Beach Boys
"San Miguel", recorded by the Kingston Trio and Lonnie Donegan (among others)
San Miguel Beer
San Miguel Brewery, a Philippine brewery
San Miguel Corporation, a Philippine food, beverage and packaging company
San Miguel Beermen, a professional basketball team in the Philippines playing in the Philippine Basketball Association
San Miguel Beermen (ABL), a professional basketball team in the Philippines that played in the ASEAN Basketball League

See also 
 Saint Michael (disambiguation)
 San Michele (disambiguation)
 San Miguel Beer (disambiguation)
 San Miguel River (disambiguation)
 San Miguel de Aguayo (disambiguation)
 São Miguel (disambiguation)